= Mark Lowe (motorsport) =

British engineer

- Citizenship: British
- Education: Kingston University
- Occupation: Engineer
- Employer: Haas F1 Team
- Known for: Formula One engineer
- Title: Sporting Director

Mark Lowe is a British Formula One engineer and motorsport executive. He is currently the Sporting Director at the Haas F1 Team.

== Career ==
Lowe studied Motorsport Engineering at Kingston University, graduating with a Bachelor of Engineering degree with first-class honours in 2006. He joined the Haas F1 Team in 2022 as Operations Manager, where he was responsible for overseeing day-to-day logistical planning, factory-to-track coordination, and the management of race event infrastructure.

In 2024 Lowe briefly served as Director of Operations at Expert Hosts, further broadening his experience in organisational leadership and event delivery, before returning to Haas. In January 2025 he was appointed Sporting Director of the Haas F1 Team. In this capacity, Lowe oversees the team's sporting operations at Grands Prix, acting as the principal liaison with the FIA and Formula One Management on regulatory, procedural, and operational matters.
